Mikhail Gurevich may refer to:

 Mikhail Gurevich (psychiatrist) (1878–1953), Soviet psychiatrist
 Mikhail Gurevich (aircraft designer) (1893–1976), co-founder of the Soviet Mikoyan-and-Gurevich Design Bureau (MiG)
 Mikhail Gurevich (chess player) (born 1956), chess player